Benzonia may refer to:

 Benzonia, Michigan, a village in the U.S. state of Michigan
 Benzonia (plant), a genus of flowering plants in the family Rubiaceae